The Lotus E23 Hybrid is a Formula One racing car which Lotus used to compete in the 2015 Formula One season. The chassis was designed by Nick Chester, Chris Cooney, Martin Tolliday and Nicolas Hennel with Mercedes supplying the team's powertrain. It was driven by Romain Grosjean and Pastor Maldonado. This was the team's only car to use Mercedes engines, after a 20-year partnership with Renault.

Images of the 2015 car were released on 26 January 2015.

The Lotus-Mercedes partnership was originally intended to last for six years (until 2020), but was terminated five years earlier as the team returned to Renault power unit after a single season and thus bought ill-fated Lotus stake from 2016 onwards and renamed back to Renault Sport Formula One Team.

Season summary
After the team's dramatic slump in 2014, the 2015 season marked a small improvement in form. The car was considered an improvement compared to the disastrous Lotus E22, which suffered from reliability issues and struggling for competitiveness due to the underpowered and unreliable Renault power unit and the fundamental flaws of the E22 chassis. However, both driver errors and unreliability cost the team points finishes in many races, limiting the car's potential of consistent points scoring. Maldonado retired in 5 out of the first 6 races either due to collisions or car problems. Grosjean and Maldonado collided with each other, in Spain and Britain. A highlight of the season however was Grosjean's podium finish in Belgium. Lotus ended its last season with 78 points and a 6th place in the World Constructors' Championship, before its buyout from Renault Sport.

Sponsorship and livery 
The team promoted the movie Mad Max: Fury Road at the 2015 Spanish Grand Prix. At the 2015 Singapore Grand Prix Lotus celebrated the launch of the Forza Motorsport 6 game and to celebrate, drivers wore green Xbox overalls.

Complete Formula One results

(key) (results in bold indicate pole position; results in italics indicate fastest lap)

 Driver failed to finish the race, but was classified as they had completed greater than 90% of the race distance.

References

E23 Hybrid
2015 Formula One season cars